The Defence Bills Agency was an executive agency of the United Kingdom Ministry of Defence (MoD) which paid the bills from MOD contracts, invoices and collects MOD receipts and provides financial management information to budget holders. It was responsible to the Minister for Defence Procurement.

Its Chief Executive was Norman Swanney. It was merged into the Financial Management Shared Service Centre (FMSSC).

See also
Departments of the United Kingdom Government

External links
 https://web.archive.org/web/20070929203142/http://www.defencebills.mod.uk/

Defence agencies of the United Kingdom
Defunct executive agencies of the United Kingdom government
Military history of Liverpool
Organisations based in Liverpool